The World Group Play-offs were the main play-offs of 2006 Davis Cup. Winners advanced to the World Group, and loser were relegated in the Zonal Regions I.

Teams
Bold indicates team has qualified for the 2007 Davis Cup World Group.

 From World Group

 From Americas Group I

 From Asia/Oceania Group I

 From Europe/Africa Group I

Results

Seeded teams
 
 
 
 
 
 
 
 

Unseeded teams

 
 
 
 
 
  
 
 

Playoff results

Austria vs. Mexico

Germany vs. Thailand

Netherlands vs. Czech Republic

Romania vs. South Korea

Slovakia vs. Belgium

Spain vs. Italy

Brazil vs. Sweden

Switzerland vs Serbia and Montenegro

References

World Group Play-offs